Alphabet Inc. is an American multinational technology conglomerate holding company headquartered in Mountain View, California. It was created through a restructuring of Google on October 2, 2015, and became the parent company of Google and several former Google subsidiaries. Alphabet is the world's third-largest technology company by revenue and one of the world's most valuable companies. It is one of the Big Five American information technology companies, alongside Amazon, Apple, Meta, and Microsoft.

The establishment of Alphabet Inc. was prompted by a desire to make the core Google business "cleaner and more accountable" while allowing greater autonomy to group companies that operate in businesses other than Internet services. Founders Larry Page and Sergey Brin announced their resignation from their executive posts in December 2019, with the CEO role to be filled by Sundar Pichai, also the CEO of Google. Page and Brin remain employees, board members, and controlling shareholders of Alphabet Inc.

History 
On August 10, 2015, Google Inc. announced plans to create a new public holding company, Alphabet Inc. Google CEO Larry Page made this announcement in a blog post on Google's official blog. Alphabet would be created to restructure Google by moving subsidiaries from Google to Alphabet, narrowing Google's scope. The company would consist of Google as well as other businesses including X Development, Calico, Nest, Verily, Fiber, Makani, CapitalG, and GV. Sundar Pichai, Product Chief, became the new CEO of Google, replacing Larry Page, who transitioned to the role of running Alphabet, along with Google co-founder Sergey Brin.

In his announcement, Page stated that the planned holding company would allow for "more management scale, as we can run things independently that aren't very related" to Google. He clarified that, as a result of the new holding company, Google would be "a bit slimmed down, with the companies that are pretty far afield of our main internet products contained in Alphabet instead". He further stated that the motivation behind the reorganization is to make Google "cleaner and more accountable and better" and that that he wanted to improve "the transparency and oversight of what we're doing".

Former executive Eric Schmidt (now Technical Advisor) revealed in the conference in 2017 the inspiration for this structure came from Warren Buffett and his management structure of Berkshire Hathaway a decade ago. Schmidt said it was he who encouraged Page and Brin to meet with Buffett in Omaha to see how Berkshire Hathaway was a holding company made of subsidiaries with strong CEOs who were trusted to run their businesses.

Before it became a subsidiary of Alphabet, Google Inc. was first structured as the owner of Alphabet. The roles were reversed after a placeholder subsidiary was created for the ownership of Alphabet, at which point the newly formed subsidiary was merged with Google. Google's stock was then converted to Alphabet's stock. Under the Delaware General Corporation Law (where Alphabet is incorporated), a holding company reorganization such as this can be done without a vote of shareholders, as this reorganization was. The restructuring process was completed on October 2, 2015. Alphabet retains Google Inc.'s stock price history and continues to trade under Google Inc.'s former ticker symbols "GOOG" and "GOOGL"; both classes of stock are components of major stock market indices such as the S&P 500 and NASDAQ-100.

On December 3, 2019, Page and Brin jointly announced that they would step down from their respective roles, remaining as employees and still the majority vote on the board of directors. Sundar Pichai, the CEO of Google, assumed the CEO role at Alphabet while retaining the same at Google.

The firm completed a stock split in mid-2022.

On January 20, 2023, Pichai wrote a letter to all employees announcing that the company would be laying off about 12,000 jobs, or 6% of its global workforce. In the letter, Pichai wrote, "Over the past two years we’ve seen periods of dramatic growth. To match and fuel that growth, we hired for a different economic reality than the one we face today."

Structure 
Beside its largest subsidiary, Google, Alphabet Inc. has several other subsidiaries in several other industries, among others:

, their equity is held by a subsidiary known as XXVI Holdings, Inc. (referring to the Roman numeral of 26, the number of letters in the alphabet), so that they can be valued and legally separated from Google. At the same time, it was announced that Google would be reorganized as a limited liability company, Google LLC.

Eric Schmidt said at an Internet Association event in 2015 that there may eventually be more than 26 Alphabet subsidiaries. He also said that he was currently meeting with the CEOs of the current and proposed Alphabet subsidiaries. He said, "You'll see a lot coming."

While many companies or divisions formerly a part of Google became subsidiaries of Alphabet, Google remains the umbrella company for Alphabet's Internet-related businesses. These include widely used products and services long associated with Google, such as the Android mobile operating system, YouTube, and Google Search, which remain direct components of Google.

Former subsidiaries include Nest Labs, which was merged into Google in February 2018 and Chronicle which was merged with Google Cloud in June 2019. Sidewalk Labs was absorbed into Google in 2021 following CEO Daniel L. Doctoroff's departure from the company due to a suspected ALS diagnosis.

In January 2021, Loon LLC CEO Alastair Westgarth mentioned in a blog post that the company would be shutting down, citing lack of a scalable and sustainable business model. In July 2021, Alphabet announced Intrinsic, a new robotics software company spun out of X. In November 2021, Alphabet announced a new company named Isomorphic Labs, using artificial intelligence for drug discovery and headed by DeepMind CEO Demis Hassabis.

Senior leadership 

 Chair: John L. Hennessy (since February 2018)
 Chief Executive: Sundar Pichai (since December 2019)
 Chief Financial Officer: Ruth Porat
 Chief Accounting Officer: Amie Thuener O'Toole

List of former board chairs 

 Eric Schmidt (2015–2017)

List of former chief executives 

 Larry Page (2015–2018)

Corporate identity 
Page explained the origin of the company's name:

In a 2018 talk, Schmidt disclosed that the original inspiration for the name came from the location of the then Google Hamburg office's street address: ABC-Straße.

Alphabet has chosen the domain abc.xyz with the .xyz top-level domain (TLD), which was introduced in 2014. It does not own the domain alphabet.com, which is owned by a fleet management division of BMW. Following the announcement, BMW said it would be "necessary to examine the legal trademark implications" of the proposals. Additionally, it does not own the domain abc.com, which is the domain of the Disney-owned American Broadcasting Company.

The website features an Easter egg in the paragraph where Larry Page writes, "Sergey and I are seriously in the business of starting new things. Alphabet will also include our X lab, which incubates new efforts like Wing, our drone delivery effort. We are also stoked about growing our investment arms, Ventures and Capital, as part of this new structure." The period after "drone delivery effort" is a hyperlink to "hooli.xyz", a reference to the television series Silicon Valley.

Finances 
For the fiscal (and calendar) year 2021, Alphabet reported a net income of $76.033 billion. The annual revenue was $257.6 billion, an increase of 41% over the previous fiscal year.

As per its 2017 annual report, 86% of Alphabet's revenues came from performance advertising (through user clicks using AdSense and Google Ads) and brand advertising. Of these, 53% came from its international operations. This translated to a total revenue of US$110,855 million in 2017 and a net income of US$12,662 million.

On February 1, 2016, Alphabet Inc. surpassed Apple to become the world's most valuable publicly traded company until February 3, 2016, when Apple surged back over Alphabet to retake the position. Experts cited Apple's lack of innovation as well as increasing Chinese competition as reasons for the poor performance.

, Alphabet is ranked No. 15 on the Fortune 500 rankings of the largest United States corporations by total revenue.

On January 16, 2020, Alphabet became the fourth US company to reach a $1 trillion market value entering the trillion dollar companies club for the first time.

In October 2022, Alphabet recorded the weakest quarterly growth, with fewer sales in nearly a decade. The possible global recession, the strong US dollar, and the pandemics all contributed to the slowed economy.

Investments and acquisitions

Investments 
In November 2017, Alphabet Inc. led a Series A round of $71 million along with Andreessen Horowitz and 20th Century Fox in music startup UnitedMasters, founded by Steve Stoute.

In addition to funding startups, Alphabet also invests in more mature companies, including publicly traded companies like Uber and privately held companies like Medium.

Acquisitions 

An analysis of the company's investments in 2017 suggested that it was the most active investor in that period, outdoing the capital arm of Intel and also its own best customer. Alphabet, Inc. acquired seven of its own capital-backed startups in the 2017 financial year, with Cisco second having acquired six of the company's previous investments.

Lawsuits and controversies

In 2017, Alphabet Inc. sued Uber over technology similar to Alphabet's proprietary self-driving car technology. Alphabet's autonomous vehicle technology had been under development for a decade by Alphabet's Waymo (self-driving vehicle division). The proprietary technology is related to 14,000 documents believed to have been downloaded and stolen by a former Waymo engineer, subsequently employed by Uber. The lawsuit was settled in February 2018, with Uber agreeing not to use the self-driving technology in dispute and also agreed to provide Waymo with an equity stake of 0.34%, equating to around $245 million at the firm's early 2018 value.

In October 2018, a class action lawsuit was filed against Google and Alphabet due to "non-public" Google+ account data being exposed as a result of a privacy bug that allowed app developers to gain access to the private information of users. The litigation was settled in July 2020 for $7.5 million with a payout to claimants of at least $5 each, with a maximum of $12 each.

In October 2020, the United States Department of Justice filed an antitrust lawsuit against Alphabet, alleging anti-competitive practices.

On 2 December 2020, the National Labor Relations Board filed a complaint that claimed Alphabet Inc conducted unlawful monitoring and questioning of several workers at Google. The employees in question were fired for unionization attempts and protesting company policies. The board also alleges that Google unlawfully placed employees on administrative leave in retribution. Alphabet Inc has denied any wrongdoing and said it acted legally.

On 7 June 2021, Alphabet Inc., parent company to Google, announced it had settled an antitrust suit with the French Autorité de la concurrence with a payment of $270 million. The settlement amounted to less than 0.7% of Alphabet Inc.'s yearly earnings.

On 12 June 2021, it was announced that Japan would launch an antitrust probe into Alphabet Inc. and Apple Inc. to determine whether their dealings with Japanese smartphone makers violate current antitrust measures or could necessitate new ones.

In May 2022, the Russian authorities have seized Google's Russian bank account  forcing them to file for bankruptcy one month after as they are unable to pay vendors and staff. However, they continue to keep free services such as Search, YouTube, Gmail, Maps, Android and Play available.

In 2023, the company was criticized for conducting mass lay-offs without informing employees before they arrived to work, including many long-tenured and recently promoted employees. According to various posts on Social Media, several Google employees discovered they had been terminated after they were unable to access their accounts and confirming it through news articles discussing the mass layoffs.

See also 
 Google LLC

References

External links 

 

 
2015 establishments in California
American companies established in 2015
Companies based in Mountain View, California
Companies based in Silicon Valley
Companies listed on the Nasdaq
Computer-related introductions in 2015
Conglomerate companies established in 2015
Conglomerate companies of the United States
Google
Holding companies established in 2015
Holding companies of the United States
Multinational companies headquartered in the United States
Technology companies based in the San Francisco Bay Area
Technology companies established in 2015
Biotechnology companies of the United States